Château de Linardié is the name for a once active cultural center located in the South West area of France seven kilometres from Gaillac in the Tarn, France. It operated for 10 years, from 1996 to 2006.

History

 Château de Linardié functioned with the financial support from the town of Gaillac (led by its dynamic Mayor Charles Pistre), from the Department of the Tarn, and from the Midi-Pyrénées region. The project entailed the physical restoration of the Château itself and the establishment of an Association to run its activities. Founder  David Marshall  began work on the Château on 8 January 1996 and the Association Culturelle du Château de Linardié was officially declared on 6 November 1996.

Château de Linardié employed secretarial and administrative personnel and appointed as artistic director, Danielle Delouche, a graduate from the University of Sorbonne VIII, Paris, and a specialist in Art History, who has been a contributor to numerous art and design periodicals. The Association collaborated with the University of Toulouse le Mirail, where the Director of the Department of Fine Arts and Applied Arts, Xavier Lambert, as well as the Maître des Conférences, Carole Hoffman, were responsible for seminars, colloquia, and conferences. They were especially helpful in helping Linardié develop its artistic policy. Another key person was Francis Pratt, a former research fellow at the University of Stirling in Scotland where he was a founder member of the Vision Group.

Due to legal difficulties encountered by Gaillac, the town was forced to cede ownership of the Château in September 2006.
It is no longer available to the Association and is now rapidly falling back into the state of ruin from which David Marshall rescued it in 1996.

References

Further references about the exhibitions that Linardié has mounted can be found by using Google under the heading, « Château de Linardié », where there are currently over 700 pages listed, quoting or presenting the work that has been accomplished at Linardié over a period of ten years.

Artists exhibited at Château de Linardié

Jacky BORZYCKI / painting	5 to 25 May 1997	France
Isabelle MAUREAU / painting	6 to 14 May 1998	France
Linda SHEPARD / glasswork	4 to 28 June 1998	U.S.A.
Thérèse BRANDEAU / sculpture	6 to 30 August 1998	France
Hilary McMICHAEL / painting	17 September to 18 October 1998	UK.
Anne McMICHAEL / ceramics	17 September to 18 October 1998	UK.
Vi N'GUYEN / painted sculpture	22 October to 15 November 1998	Vietnam
Paul REY / painting	1 to 25 April 1999	France
Marianne CATROUX / relief 	10 June to 4 July 1999	France
Katherine BOUCHARD / installation	15 July to 22 August 1999	Canada
Francis PRATT / painting	15 July to 22 August 1999	UK.
Roger BRACE / painting	15 July to 22 August 1999	UK.
Jill LANE / painting	15 July to 22 August 1999	UK.
Frank TOURREL / painting	2 to 26 September 1999	France
Patrick COHN / multi media	7 to 31 October 1999	France
CATERINA / painting	16 March to 9 April 2000	France
Jacky BORZYCKI / painting	11 May to 3 June 2000	France
Françoise BERTHELOT / sculpture	8 July to 31 August 2000	France
Joe BIGBIG / sculpture	8 July to 31 August 2000	Ghana
Patrick COHN / installation	8 July to 31 August 2000	France
Nacéra DÉSIGAUD / sculpture	8 July to 31 August 2000	Algeria
Patrick DIAZ sculpture	8 July to 31 August 2000	France
Thierry FRUMIN / installation	8 July to 31 August 2000	France
Jean-Baptiste GAUDIN / installation	8 July to 31 August 2000	France
Ernst GOTTSCHALK / sculpture	8 July to 31 August 2000	UK.
Xavier KREBS / painting	8 July to 31 August 2000	France
Stephen MARSDEN / painting	8 July to 31 August 2000	UK.
David MARSHALL / ceramics	8 July to 31 August 2000	UK.
Francis MASCLES / sculpture	8 July to 31 August 2000	France
Véronique MATTEUDI / sculpture	8 July to 31 August 2000	France
Abel REIS / sculpture	8 July to 31 August 2000	Brazil
Linda SHEPARD / glasswork	8 July to 31 August 2000	U.S.A.
Laure TETAR / multi media	12 October to 12 November 2000	France
Vincent GIOUSE / drawing	5 April to 20 May 2001	France
David RIBAS / painting	25 May to 1 July 2001	France
Anne FLEURY / painting	25 May to 1 July 2001	France
Marianne CATROUX / relief	8 July to 2 September 2001	French
Linda SHEPARD / glasswork	8 July to 2 September 2001	U.S.A.
Tidjane SEKOU TRAORÉ / sculpture	8 July to 2 September 2001	Burkina-Faso
Andrée OMNES-PLAT / drawing	7 September to 7 October 2001	France
Philippe ASSALIT / photography	21 October to 5 November 2001	France
Élisabeth POIRET / painting	28 March to 28 April 2002	France
Paul VILLAIN / poetry	28 March to 28 April 2002	France
Marika PERROS / painting	5 May to 23 June 2002	France
Jean-Philippe BAERT / installation	4 July to 25 August 2002	France
Patrick COHN / installation	4 July to 25 August 2002	France
Marie MAQUAIRE / video 	4 July to 25 August 2002	France
Monsieur CLUB & the Jim Caddy's Assistants / video – multi media	4 July to 25 August 2002	Germany France
Rémi PAPILLAULT / architect – installation	4 July to 25 August 2002	France
Alain JOSSEAU / multi media – installation	5 September to 20 October 2002	France
Agnès CHARBONNEL / photography	27 October to 24 November 2002	France
Sylvie FONTAYNE / photography	27 October to 24 November 2002	France
Anne MONTAUT / photography	27 October to 24 November 2002	France
Christine MORAZIN / photography	27 October to 24 November 2002	France
Fabrice DESAMIS / painting – collage	3 April to 18 May 2003	France
Eric ANDRÉATTA / installation – video	7 July to 31 August 2003	France
Claude FAURE / installation	7 July to 31 August 2003	France
Jakob GAUTEL / installation	7 July to 31 August 2003	Germany
Jason KARAÏNDROS / installation	7 July to 31 August 2003	France
Xavier LAMBERT / multi media	7 July to 31 August 2003	France
Miller LEVY / video	7 July to 31 August 2003	France
Pol PEREZ / installation	7 July to 31 August 2003	France
Les REQUINS MARTEAUX / installation	7 July to 31 August 2003	France
Pierrick SORIN / video	7 July to 31 August 2003	France
Véronique BARTHE / photography	7 September to 19 October 2003	France
Mireille LOUP / multi media – video	7 September to 19 October 2003	France
Mabel ODESSEY / photography	26 October to 23 November 2003	U.S.A.
Carole AUBERT / painting – installation	23 May to 27 June 2004	France
Didier CROS / painting	23 May to 27 June 2004	France
Chu-Yin CHEN / video – multi media	4 July to 29 August 2004	Korea
LAWICKMÜLLER / digital photography	4 July to 29 August 2004	Germany
Stéphane MASSON / installation	4 July to 29 August 2004	France
 Orlan / multi media – photography	4 July to 29 August 2004	France
Nicole TRAN BA VANG / digital photography	4 July to 29 August 2004	Vietnam
Zhou XIAOHU / video installation	4 July to 29 August 2004	China
Ghizlane ABBADI / video	5 September to 17 October 2004	Morocco
Frédéric BELLI / painting – installation	5 September to 17 October 2004	France
Shadi GHADIRIAN / photography	5 September to 17 October 2004	Iran
Claude JEANMART / digital photography	5 September to 17 October 2004	France
Ginette LAFON / photography – installation	5 September to 17 October 2004	France
Véronique SAPIN / Video	5 September to 17 October 2004	France
Alice ODILON / photography	24 September to 28 November 2004	France
Thanos CHRYSAKIS / sound installation	3 April to 8 May 2005	Greece
Pascal Dombis / multi media installation	3 April to 8 May 2005	France
Francis PRATT / painting – Science	3 April to 8 May 2005	UK.
Rachel HENRIOT / multi media – video	15 May to 26 June 2005	France
Louis BEC / multi media installation – Science	3 July to 28 August 2005	France
Michel BRET / multi media 	3 July to 28 August 2005	France
Edmond Couchot / multi media 	3 July to 28 August 2005	France
Carmen MARISCAL / photography installation	3 July to 28 August 2005	Mexico
 Karl Sims / video	3 July to 28 August 2005	U.S.A.
Marie-Hélène TRAMUS / multi media	3 July to 28 August 2005	France
 Joseph Nechvatal / painting – Science	4 September to 16 October 2005	U.S.A.
Laurence DEMAISON / photography	30 October to 27 November 2005	France
Hans BOUMAN / video 	11 March to 7 May 2006	Holland
Andrea FORTINA / painting	11 March to 7 May 2006	Italy
Gilles GHEZ / modelage installation	11 March to 7 May 2006	France
Anne GOROUBEN / drawing – painting	11 March to 7 May 2006	France
Claude JEANMART / video multi media	11 March to 7 May 2006	France
Paloma NAVARES / photography	11 March to 7 May 2006	Spain
Vladimir SKODA / sculpture	11 March to 7 May 2006	Czech Rep.
Jack VANARSKY / installation	11 March to 7 May 2006	Argentina
Paloma Navares / photography – installation	3 June to 20 August 2006	Spain

Contemporary art galleries in France
Non-profit organizations based in France
Linardie
Art museums and galleries in France